Totally Spies! The Movie (French: Totally Spies! Le film) is a 2009 animated spy-action comedy film directed by Pascal Jardin and written by Robert and Michelle Lamoreaux. A French-Italian co-production, it is an adaptation of Totally Spies!, an animated television series created by Vincent Chalvon-Demersay and David Michel, about a trio of teenagers from Beverly Hills who become spies for the World Organization of Human Protection.

The film is a prequel to the television series and covers how the girls first met and shows how they became spies. The film stars the voices of the original cast of the television series and also features the voice of German fashion designer Karl Lagerfeld as the main antagonist. It is the first theatrical film based on a TF1's TFOU animated series.

The film was released on 22 July 2009 in France by Mars Distribution. Internationally, it made its debut direct-to-television on Cartoon Network.

Plot 
The film begins with three teenage girls named Samantha, Alexandra, and Clover starting their new lives in Beverly Hills, California. As each of them were about to cross paths outside a sushi restaurant, nearby WOOHP agents purposely cause the giant sushi roll above the entrance to break off and chase after them, setting some nearby animals free in the process. The giant sushi roll, with the three girls log rolling on top of it, chases a piglet to the street. The three girls are able to avoid it and Alex saves the life of the piglet (which she later adopts and names "Oinky") and the girls destroy the sushi roll before it causes any damage. After that, Alex, Sam, and Clover introduce themselves and this starts their friendship when they later see each other again at their new school, meet the current principal Miss Skrich and their rivals, Mandy, Dominique and Caitlin. Clover offers her new friends a change of clothes after Mandy sprays them with a chai machine, but they find themselves sucked in through a locker and into one of the offices of WOOHP. Here, they meet Jerry Lewis and fellow WOOHP agent Tad. Jerry reveals that WOOHP had been observing the three of them secretly since childhood, showing videos of each girl, and picking them as prime recruits for the organization. The girls are quick to reject the invitation and refuse to join, but they later are "forced" into training after each having traumatic experiences that seemingly relate to WOOHP. They agree to go through training and in 48 hours, complete their training.

After training, they're thrown into their first mission when famous celebrities, including rock star Rob Hearthrob and animal psychologist Peppy Wolfman, have been mysteriously abducted. This also shows how the girls obtained their differently colored uniforms (thanks to a design suggestion by Clover). They first go to Wolfman's building where Alex has Oinky "go hog wild for mommy" as a distraction, and Oinky deliberately runs around the lobby with the other animals and the receptionist in pursuit. They later find that each went through a makeover by a mysterious machine called the "Fabulizor", discovered thanks to security footage in Wolfman's office. They later see that everyone at school also had gone through the Fabulizor, having the same look the next day, and Oinky ends up going through the Fabulizor, getting the same makeover as well. This is after nearly being blasted by one of the bad guy's minions in a fighter jet while being flown back to school and after nearly avoiding Miss Skritch as they sneak back into school. Tailing Mandy that night, they find that all of those who went through the Fabulizor became hypnotized by a special chip in their cheekbones prior to the makeover and Alex spots Oinky behind the crowd and grabs onto him, with Sam and Clover grabbing onto Alex as they get abducted into a strange space station out in space, after being abducted they disguised themselves as one of them by adding makeup. They then meet the mastermind behind the entire affair, Fabu, a runway model who quickly lost fame in five minutes on the runway and was ashamed of not being a part of the crowd during his childhood. The spies accidentally expose themselves and are captured by Fabu's strongest henchmen. He then relates his entire plan, to abduct everyone who went through the Fabulizor and place them inside a special space station which he calls Fabutopia to live out new lives in the posh surroundings, then uses a missile to destroy all of Earth, before using his Fabulizor in reverse and give the girls each horrible makeovers (Sam gets green skin, Clover grows a unibrow and Alex gets massive pimples). He then sets them to be blasted back to Earth in rockets. But just as he leaves, things get more difficult when Tad meets the girls again while they are still imprisoned and says he will let them fail the mission and stop Fabu himself, taking all the credit and regaining his "favorite agent" status with Jerry.

But after a fight with Fabu, Tad is strapped to the missile bound for Earth. The girls manage to escape and, after fixing the Fabulizor's damage to themselves, go after Fabu. They are unable to stop the missile from taking off but hitch a ride as it is rocketing towards Earth with Tad still attached to it. They are able to turn the missile around to destroy the station, surprising the girls since they had no idea of how to stop it earlier, and Alex whacks at the control panel with the WOOHP manual. They then are picked up by a surprise appearance from Jerry in one of WOOHP's ships and rescue the kidnapped people from aboard the station (freeing them of the hypnotic trance by destroying Fabu's signal beacon in his staff) and evacuate safely, including Oinky, who Alex thought was never going to make it out in time, only to see him run fast to her, finally reunited with Alex before the missile explodes and destroys the station in a firework finale. They then chase after Fabu's ship, manage to destroy it, and catch Fabu and his Sphynx in his escape pod. After the mission, the girls admit that the mission was difficult at first, but it also made them friends, so they accept their position as spies. Alex is invited for a session with Wolfman, and Clover is offered a date by Rob Hearthrob over the phone. But before that, they later return to school to face punishment from the principal for the "damage" they caused when trying to avoid her earlier on in the movie (thanks to Sam using a laser lipstick to cut an escape hole in the wall earlier). But fortunately, it seems that thanks to WOOHP, they have a new principal (who goes off unnamed) who seemingly does not know about the girls' punishment and gives Sam high praise.

Miss Skritch had been transferred to another school in Siberia in an igloo (which has biogeographically misplaced penguins) as punishment by the Beverly Hills school district for child abuse, Fabu, his henchman and Tad are later imprisoned and set for punishment by WOOHP, and everyone who was rescued from aboard Fabu's space station have their minds erased (including Mandy). But just after the girls celebrate getting even with Mandy for the last time, courtesy of one of WOOHP's gadgets, they are notified of another mission. The girls are quick to bring up personal appointments but soon find themselves running from a WOOHP jet as it prepares to suck them aboard. But the girls are ready for their next mission as they change into their spy uniforms and exclaim their friendship, ending the film.

Voice cast

Release

Theatrical 
The film has released in France on July 22, 2009, in 272 theaters, then later released on DVD by Fox Pathé Europa. On October 14, 2009, the film appeared in the Netherlands, staying there for seven weeks. On March 10, 2010, It was released on DVD format over there.

Television 
The film aired on Disney Channel Asia on February 27, 2010, a week later that of the premiere of the season finale adaptation of its spin-off, The Amazing Spiez!. Prior to the film version, Disney Channel Asia has made two compilation movies of the TV series. The first one covers the 3rd season finale (Evil Promotion Much? Part 1-3) and the second one covers the 4th season finale (Totally Busted! Part 1-3). The film premiered on the British children's channel Pop on March 29, 2016. The film was first shown in the US on Cartoon Network on April 25, 2010 at 7pm.

DVD release 
A DVD of the movie in its original language, French, was released in France on February 3 through Fox Pathé Europa. It topped charts in the French Amazon in the week of its release.

Vendetta Films, a new New Zealand film distribution company, has recently confirmed the release date of the Totally Spies! The Movie DVD. It will be released on 1 April, nothing else has been announced. Vendetta can ship overseas. It was also announced that it will cost $24.99 NZD. Marathon currently has no plans to release it in Latin America. On March 30, 2010, Cartoon Network obtained the rights to release Totally Spies! The Movie in America, including the spin-off, The Amazing Spiez!

Soundtrack 
There is also an official soundtrack that has been released in France but never released in North America. This included "Walk Like an Egyptian" by The Bangles during one scene of the film. The opening and ending credits for the film was "Gold Guns Girls" by Canadian rock band Metric.

Reception

Box office 
The film grossed $572,000 on the first weekend and ranked at number #9 at the French box office with approximately $2,100 per theater. The gross for the second, third, and fourth weekends were $191,000, $89,106 and $29,083 respectively. The film grossed $1.3 million internationally.

Accolades

References

External links 
  (archive) 
 
 
 

2009 films
2009 animated films
2000s spy comedy films
2009 action films
French animated films
French children's films
2000s French animated films
French spy comedy films
Italian animated films
Italian children's films
Italian spy comedy films
Totally Spies!
Space adventure films
Films set in Antarctica
Films set in Beverly Hills, California
Films set in Los Angeles
Films set in New York City
Films set in Paris
Prequel films
2000s French-language films
Anime-influenced Western animation
Animated films based on animated series
French prequel films
Italian prequel films